Ripiphorus is a genus of wedge-shaped beetles in the family Ripiphoridae. There are at least 30 described species in Ripiphorus.

Species
These 34 species belong to the genus Ripiphorus:

 Ripiphorus aurantus Rivnay, 1929 i c g
 Ripiphorus blaisdelli Linsley and MacSwain, 1950 i c g
 Ripiphorus caboverdianus g
 Ripiphorus californicus (LeConte, 1880) i c g
 Ripiphorus calopterus Rivnay, 1929 i c g
 Ripiphorus columbianus Brown, 1930 i c g
 Ripiphorus dammersi Barber, 1939 i c g
 Ripiphorus diadasiae Linsley & MacSwain, 1950 i c g b
 Ripiphorus epinomiae Linsley & MacSwain, 1950 i c g b
 Ripiphorus eremicola Linsley and MacSwain, 1950 i c g
 Ripiphorus fasciatus (Say, 1823) i c g
 Ripiphorus flavicornis (Say, 1823) i c g
 Ripiphorus iridescens Rivnay, 1929 i c g
 Ripiphorus luteipennis LeConte, 1865 i c g
 Ripiphorus minimus (Pierce, 1904) i c g
 Ripiphorus mutchleri Rivnay, 1929 i c g b
 Ripiphorus neomexicanus Rivnay, 1929 i c g
 Ripiphorus nevadicus (LeConte, 1880) i c g
 Ripiphorus nomiae Rivnay, 1929 i c g
 Ripiphorus popenoei (LeConte, 1880) i c g
 Ripiphorus rex b
 Ripiphorus scaber (LeConte, 1852) i c g
 Ripiphorus schwarzi (LeConte, 1880) i c g b
 Ripiphorus semiflavus (LeConte, 1865) i c g
 Ripiphorus sexdens Linsley & MacSwain, 1950 i c g b
 Ripiphorus simplex Champion, 1891 i c g
 Ripiphorus smithi Linsley and MacSwain, 1950 i c g
 Ripiphorus solidaginis (Pierce, 1902) i c g
 Ripiphorus stylopides (Newman, 1838) i c g
 Ripiphorus subdipterus Bosc d'Antic, 1792 g
 Ripiphorus vierecki (Fall, 1907) i c g b
 Ripiphorus walshi (LeConte, 1865) i c g
 Ripiphorus walshii (LeConte, 1865) b
 Ripiphorus zeschii (LeConte, 1880) g

Data sources: i = ITIS, c = Catalogue of Life, g = GBIF, b = Bugguide.net

References

Further reading

External links

 

Ripiphoridae
Articles created by Qbugbot